Purne is a village in Ladakh.

References 

Coordinates: 

Villages in Zanskar tehsil